Nicholas Aylward Vigors (1785 – 26 October 1840) was an Irish zoologist and politician. He popularized the classification of birds on the basis of the quinarian system.

Early life

Vigors was born at Old Leighlin, County Carlow on 1785 as first son from Capt. Nicholas Aylward Vigors which served in  29th (Worcestershire) Regiment and, his first wife, Catherine Vigors,  daughter of Solomon Richards of Solsborough. He matriculated at Trinity College, Oxford on November 1803 before he was admitted at Lincoln's Inn on November 1806. Without completing his studies, he served in the army during the Peninsular War from 1809 to 1811 and wounded in Battle of Barossa on 5 March 1811. Though, he haven't completed his studies yet, he still published "An inquiry into the nature and extent of poetick licence"  in London at 1810.  He then returned to Oxford to continued his studies and achieved his Bachelor of Arts on 1817 and Master of Arts on 1818.  He practiced as a barrister and became a Doctor of Civil Law in 1832.

Zoology

Vigors was a co-founder of the Zoological Society of London in 1826, and its first secretary until 1833. In that year, he founded what became the Royal Entomological Society of London. He was a fellow of the Linnean Society and the Royal Society. He was the author of 40 papers, mostly on ornithology. He described 110 species of birds, enough to rank him among the top 30 bird authors historically. He provided the text for John Gould's A Century of Birds from the  Himalaya Mountains (1830–32).

One bird that he described was "Sabine's snipe". This was treated as a common snipe by Barrett-Hamilton in 1895 and by Meinertzhagen in 1926, but was thought to be probably a Wilson's snipe in 1945. Vigors lent a skin for later editions of Thomas Bewick's History of British Birds.

Politics

Vigors succeeded to his father's estate in 1828. He was MP for the borough of Carlow from 1832 until 1835. He briefly represented the constituency of County Carlow in 1835. Vigors had been elected in a by-election in June after the Conservative MPs originally returned at the 1835 United Kingdom general election were unseated on petition and a new writ issued. On 19 August 1835 Vigors and his running mate, in the two member county constituency, were unseated on petition. The same two Conservatives who had previously been unseated were awarded the seats. On the death of one of them, Vigors won the subsequent by-election in 1837 and retained the seat until his own death.

References

Bibliography
 
 
Parliamentary Election Results in Ireland, 1801-1922, edited by B.M. Walker (Royal Irish Academy 1978)

External links 

 Art UK: Toucan by Vigors

1785 births
1840 deaths
Alumni of Trinity College, Oxford
British ornithologists
Irish ornithologists
British zoologists
Irish zoologists
Taxon authorities
Members of the Parliament of the United Kingdom for County Carlow constituencies (1801–1922)
Fellows of the Royal Society
Fellows of the Linnean Society of London
Secretaries of the Zoological Society of London
UK MPs 1832–1835
UK MPs 1835–1837
UK MPs 1837–1841
Grenadier Guards officers
British Army personnel of the Napoleonic Wars
Politicians from County Carlow
Irish Repeal Association MPs
Committee members of the Society for the Diffusion of Useful Knowledge